In the United States government, the Bureau of African Affairs (AF) is part of the U.S. Department of State and is charged with advising the Secretary of State on matters of Sub-Saharan Africa. The bureau was established in 1958. It is headed by the Assistant Secretary of State for African Affairs who reports to the Under Secretary of State for Political Affairs. Molly Phee is the current Assistant Secretary.

Organization
The offices of the Bureau of African Affairs direct, coordinate, and supervise U.S. government activities within the region, including political, economic, consular, public diplomacy, and administrative management issues.

 Office of the Assistant Secretary
 Office of the Executive Director – Coordinates logistics, management, budget, and human resources for the bureau
 Office of Central African Affairs – Oversees policy for the Central African Region, and liaises with the U.S. Embassies in Burundi, Cameroon, Central African Republic, Chad, Democratic Republic of the Congo, Republic of the Congo, Equatorial Guinea, Gabon, Rwanda, and São Tomé and Príncipe
 Office of East African Affairs – Oversees policy for the East African Region, and liaises with the U.S. Embassies in Comoros, Djibouti, Eritrea, Ethiopia, Kenya, Madagascar, Mauritius, Seychelles, Somalia, Tanzania, and Uganda
 Office of Southern African Affairs – Oversees policy for the South African Region, and liaises with the U.S. Embassies in Angola, Botswana, Eswatini, Lesotho, Malawi, Mozambique, Namibia, South Africa, Zambia, and Zimbabwe
 Office of West African Affairs – Oversees policy for the West African Region, and liaises with the U.S. Embassies in Benin, Burkina Faso, Cape Verde, Côte d’Ivoire, the Gambia, Ghana, Guinea, Guinea-Bissau, Liberia, Mali, Mauritania, Niger, Nigeria, Senegal, Sierra Leone, and Togo
Office of Regional Peace and Security – Coordinates policy regarding the African Union and other regional multilateral and security-focused issues
Office of Public Diplomacy and Public Affairs – Coordinates public outreach and digital engagement, and prepares press guidance for the Department Spokesperson in the Bureau of Public Affairs
 Office of Economic and Regional Affairs
 Office of South Sudan and Sudan - Oversees policy for the Republic of the Sudan and the Republic of South Sudan.

References

External links
 

 
AF
Government agencies established in 1958
United States diplomacy
1958 establishments in the United States
International development in Africa
United States–African relations
Angola–United States relations
Benin–United States relations
Botswana–United States relations
Burkina Faso–United States relations
Burundi–United States relations
Cameroon–United States relations
Central African Republic–United States relations
Cape Verde–United States relations
Chad–United States relations
Comoros–United States relations
Democratic Republic of the Congo–United States relations
Djibouti–United States relations
Eritrea–United States relations
Eswatini–United States relations
Ethiopia–United States relations
Equatorial Guinea–United States relations
Gabon–United States relations
The Gambia–United States relations
Ghana–United States relations
Guinea–United States relations
Guinea-Bissau–United States relations
Ivory Coast–United States relations
Kenya–United States relations
Lesotho–United States relations
Liberia–United States relations
Madagascar–United States relations
Malawi–United States relations
Mali–United States relations
Mauritania–United States relations
Mauritius–United States relations
Mozambique–United States relations
Namibia–United States relations
Niger–United States relations
Nigeria–United States relations
Republic of the Congo–United States relations
Rwanda–United States relations
São Tomé and Príncipe–United States relations
Senegal–United States relations
Seychelles–United States relations
Sierra Leone–United States relations
Somalia–United States relations
Somaliland–United States relations
South Africa–United States relations
Sudan–United States relations
South Sudan–United States relations
Tanzania–United States relations
Togo–United States relations
Uganda–United States relations
United States–Zambia relations
United States–Zimbabwe relations